Franziska Szegöffy (1816-1882) was a stage actor. She was engaged at the Estates Theatre in Prague in 1854-1874, where she belonged to the theatre's star attractions. She was known for her elder character roles.

References 

 http://encyklopedie.idu.cz/index.php/Szeg%C3%B6ffy,_Franziska

19th-century Czech actors
1816 births
1882 deaths